The Argentine ambassador in Berlin is the official representative of the Government in Buenos Aires to the Government of Germany.

List of representatives 

 Argentina–Germany relations

References 

 
Germany
Argentina